Chad Buchanan (born September 13, 1972) is the general manager of the Indiana Pacers of the National Basketball Association.

Buchanan was hired on June 29, 2017, after previously serving two seasons as the assistant general manager for the Charlotte Hornets. Prior to the Charlotte job, Buchanan spent 10 years in the Portland Trail Blazers organization, primarily as the director of college scouting. While serving as Portland’s interim general manager in 2011-12, Buchanan made the trade that sent Gerald Wallace to the Nets in exchange for the first-round pick that was later used to draft Damian Lillard. When the Pacers were considering hiring Buchanan, CBS Sports' Chris Barnewall wrote, "Buchanan is well respected across the league and his experience in college scouting is something the Pacers would find great value in."

Buchanan went to Simpson College in Indianola, Iowa, and worked as an assistant coach there from 1997-2002. He then became an assistant coach and assistant director of player personnel for the Kansas City Knights of the ABA in 2002-03 before working as an assistant coach at Drake in 2003-04.

References 

National Basketball Association general managers
Indiana Pacers executives
Living people
1972 births